Every Second Counts is the name under which comedians outside of the United States were challenged to produce parody videos of U.S. President Donald Trump's inaugural address that "From this day forward, it's gonna be only America first! America first!" The first parody video was produced by Dutch comedian Arjen Lubach within two days after Trump's inaugural address. The second comedian to produce a parody video in the same format as Lubach's video, Jan Böhmermann of Germany, challenged comedians around the world to produce similar videos in the same format of introducing one's own country with a dose of self-deprecating humour and requesting to become 'second' after America.

History

Origins 

The first parody video, which inspired all the other parody videos, was produced by Dutch comedian Arjen Lubach's show Zondag met Lubach. Lubach's parody video, titled "The Netherlands welcomes Trump in his own words", was broadcast on 22 January 2017. In the video, Trump's speeches and actions –mostly from his election campaign– are imitated and mocked by voice actor Greg Shapiro, who gives a short description of the Netherlands using some self-mockery as well, finishing with the request that the Netherlands may come 'second' if America is to be 'first'. A semi-serious undertone is formed by fears that Trump's announced "America First" policy signifies isolationism, including withdrawing U.S. support for NATO: "If you screw NATO, you're gonna make our problems great again." The video went viral, being discussed by multiple international newsmedia and reaching over 73 million views worldwide by 3 February.

Challenge launched 

On 2 February during Neo Magazin Royale, Jan Böhmermann questioned the Dutch's role as second to America, broadcasting a rival video that claimed 'Germany second' whilst making fun of the Netherlands and Germany itself as well. Then, he encouraged other satirical talkshow producers in all European countries to make similar videos parodying Trump, themselves and questioning the Netherlands' second place behind America. Production teams in at least eleven other countries committed to making their own parody videos, and by 3 February, versions for Belgium (by De Ideale Wereld), Switzerland (by Deville Late Night), Denmark (by Natholdet), Portugal (by 5 Para A Meia-Noite) and Lithuania (by Laikykitės ten) had been released; these would all be gathered on the website everysecondcounts.eu.

Shaun Streeter did the voice for the videos produced by Switzerland, Portugal, Germany, Luxembourg, and Denmark.

Beyond Europe 
By 6 February, Italy (by Casa Surace), Luxembourg (by Studio Ben), and Morocco (a non-European country, expanding the contest further) had joined the fray. On 8 February, the website of Every Second Counts changed the original layout from a virtual 360° NATO council room with national flags of all European countries plus Morocco and Namibia next to each seat, to a clickable world map divided into the continents of "Europe", "Middle East", "Africa", "Oceania", "North Asia", "South Asia", "North America" and "South America", with "North Asia" and "North America" currently being unavailable.

Common elements 

Though widely varying in contents specific to each country's presentation, and the way in which they criticise and/or ridicule President Trump and his ideas and actions, the videos often share common elements. Many revolve around (sarcastically) taking pride in or mocking their own country's history, and comparing it to Trump's actions or American history in general, and how the latter is better, equal or worse.
Criticism of Trump's immigration policy
Criticism of Trump's electoral promise and since 25 January 2017 plan to build a wall along the U.S.–Mexican border, and make Mexico pay for it, including comparisons to countries' own "walls" such as the Afsluitdijk and the Berlin Wall
Criticism of Trump's electoral promise and since 27 January 2017 decree to halt immigration from several Muslim-majority countries
Criticism of Trump's treatment of women, especially the grab them by the pussy incident
 Criticism of Trump's mockery of Serge F. Kovaleski, an investigative reporter at The New York Times with arthrogryposis.
Criticism of Trump's apparent lack of commitment to NATO
Criticism of Trump's alleged tax evasion
Ridicule of Trump's appearance: his allegedly "tiny hands" and "orange" skin colour
Mockery of Trump's use of "the best words" and the way he says "huge" (sounds like "yuge").
Comparisons between Trump's towers and famous architectural structures within the country.
Criticism of the Trump administration's usage of the terms "fake news" and "alternative facts"
Joking that nobody knows where their country is located, and pointing to a different country if Trump might ever want to strike it with a nuclear attack

Lists of videos 
Note: EverySecondCounts.eu only lists countries

Countries 

The table below lists 117 videos for 80 unique countries. At four videos, there are more videos for Algeria than for any other country listed. The  website EverySecondCounts.eu features 38 of the videos, only one per country.

Other physical locations 
The table below lists 43 videos for 40 unique entries.

Other videos
The table below lists 16 videos.

Notes

See also 
 Political positions of Donald Trump
 Nationalism
 National identity
 National memory
 Self-criticism
 World community

References

External links 

The talk page for this article, which contains a table with links to additional videos that for various reasons are not included in this article

Internet memes introduced in 2017
Internet memes introduced in the 2010s
Political Internet memes
Viral videos
Ethnic humour
Dutch political satire
German political satire
National identity
Parodies of Donald Trump